Chroming can refer to:

 chrome plating
 the use of inhalants